Ilirjan Çaushaj (born 18 March 1987) is an Albanian footballer who currently plays as a midfielder for Shënkolli.

He played for several years in the Albanian Superliga.

References

External links
 Profile - UEFA

1987 births
Living people
People from Përmet
Albanian footballers
Association football midfielders
Kategoria Superiore players
FK Dinamo Tirana players
KF Teuta Durrës players
Flamurtari Vlorë players
KS Shkumbini Peqin players
FK Tomori Berat players
KF Skënderbeu Korçë players
KF Tirana players
PAE Kerkyra players
Besa Kavajë players
KS Sopoti Librazhd players
KF Adriatiku Mamurrasi players
KS Turbina Cërrik players
KF Shënkolli players
Albanian expatriate footballers
Expatriate footballers in Greece
Albanian expatriate sportspeople in Greece